The Games is a British reality sports game show that ran on Channel 4 for four series, in which 10 celebrities competed against each other, by doing Olympic-style events, such as weight lifting, gymnastics and diving. At the end of the series, the contestants with the most points from each round were awarded either a gold, silver or bronze medal.

The series was revived by ITV in May 2022, hosted by Holly Willoughby and Freddie Flintoff.

History
The show was mainly filmed in Sheffield, at the Sheffield Arena, Don Valley Stadium and Ponds Forge. In later series, the English Institute of Sport – Sheffield, iceSheffield and in series 4 the National Watersports Centre in Nottingham were used for the first time. Most recently the show has been broadcast from the Crystal Palace National Sports Centre in south London.

Presenters
The Games was presented by Jamie Theakston for the entirety of its run, with track-side reports from Jayne Middlemiss in series 1–3 and Kirsty Gallacher in series 4. David Goldstrom was the commentator for the events.

For the 2022 revival series, it is presented by Holly Willoughby and Freddie Flintoff, with Simon Brotherton taking over as commentator with Chris Kamara by his side.

Companion shows
The Games also had an after-show called The Games: Live at Trackside, aired on Channel 4's sister channel E4. The first series was presented by Dougie Anderson, whilst the second was hosted by Gamezville presenters Darren Malcolm and Jamie Atiko. Justin Lee Collins and Caroline Flack took over as presenters for the third and fourth series. For the final series an extra one-hour show was added on E4 in the afternoon called The Games: Live at the Heats, and the evening after-show changed title to become The Games: Inside Track.

Main series results

Series 1 (2003)
The first series aired in 2003 and the celebrities that took part were:

Porter pulled out part-way through the run. A serious knee injury sustained in the judo competition against Akın also forced Chisholm to withdraw.

Series 2 (2004)

The second series aired in 2004 and the celebrities that took part were:

Champion of Champions 2004
After the second series a special champion of champions edition, took place in which the top two male and female competitors from series one and two went head to head to compete for the title, The Games Champion of Champions. Eventually the team from 2003 won. They comprised MC Harvey, James Hewitt, Terri Dwyer and Josie d'Arby (Azra Akın was unavailable to take part).

Series 3 (2005)
The third series commenced on 25 March 2005 and the celebrities that took part were:

Morris pulled out half-way through the run, and was replaced by Foster.

Injuries also forced Kevin Simm out of the Sumo competition, and Craig Charles out of the speed skating and vaulting competitions.

Champion of Champions 2005
After the third series, another special champion of champions edition took place in which the top two male and female competitors from Team 2003, Team 2004 and Team 2005 competed against each other in weightlifting, hammer throwing and finally the relay race. From Team 2003, James Hewitt, Harvey, Terri Dwyer and Josie D'Arby competed. From Team 2004, Romeo, Jarrod Batchelor, Katy Hill and Lady Isabella Hervey competed. From Team 2005, Kevin Simm, Philip Olivier, Lisa Maffia and Kirsty Gallacher, competed. Team 2005 narrowly beat the team from the first series overall.

Series 4 (2006)
The fourth series commenced on 17 March 2006, and was presented as usual by Jamie Theakston, and track-side coverage was taken over by Series Three contestant Kirsty Gallacher. There was a total of 18 different sporting events to test their skills and abilities. The men competed in water ski jump, weights, Kendo, vault, diving, speed skating, cycling, javelin and 100m sprint. The women competed in whitewater kayak, hurdles, cycling, gym floor, swimming, curling, archery, hammer and 100m sprint.

Contestants that took part in the show were:

Darren Day was among the original line-up, but after consistently failing to take part in training, he was replaced by eventual winner Jones. DJ Goldie was originally a competitor, but was forced to pull out due to an injury sustained in the training sessions for the water-ski event. He was replaced by Rickitt.

Scores

Champion of Champions 2006
After the fourth series another special champion of champions edition took place in which the top two male and female competitors from series two, three and four competed against each other in a 50 m freestyle swim, diving and a 4 x 50 m freestyle relay at Ponds Forge in Sheffield.

Javine Hylton, Julia Goldsworthy MP, Jade Jones and MC Plat'num represented Team 2006, Kirsty Gallacher, Chesney Hawkes, Kevin Simm and HRH Princess Tamara represented Team 2005, and Lady Isabella Hervey, Linda Lusardi, Shane Lynch and Romeo represented Team 2004.

Team 2006 won the champion of champions 2006, scoring 29 points. The team of 2005 came second with 23. Finally team 2004 with 20. This Champion of Champions saw Shane Lynch achieve a dive which had never been performed on The Games before – a somersault. The trophy for the winners was presented to
Team 2004, by the Lord Mayor of Sheffield, Councillor Roger Davison.

Series 5 (2022)
The series was originally commissioned for 2020 as The Real Games, and then for 2021, but both times were delayed due to COVID-19 restrictions and concerns. In October 2021, it was confirmed that the series would air in 2022.

Contestants

Scores

Events

Women's 100m hurdles

Men's hammer throw

Mixed synchronised diving

Men's 400m race

Men's 50m freestyle

Men's canoe slalom

Women's 50m breast stroke

Men's 100m hurdles

Women's javelin

Women's 400m race

Women's keirin

Men's speed climbing 
Heats

Semi-final

Final

Men's elimination race

Women's speed climbing
Olivia Attwood did not compete in this event and automatically received 1 point.
Heats

Semi-final

Final

Women's weightlifting

Women's 100m race

Men's 100m race

References

External links
 
 

2003 British television series debuts
2022 British television series endings
2000s British game shows
2020s British game shows
2000s British reality television series
2020s British reality television series
2000s British sports television series
2020s British sports television series
British television series revived after cancellation
Channel 4 game shows
Channel 4 reality television shows
ITV game shows
ITV reality television shows
English-language television shows
Television series by Banijay